Stjepan Perić (born 1 March 1983) is a Croatian actor.

Biography
After finishing high school, Perić studied law at the University of Zagreb. In 2003, he quit law to pursue a career as an actor.

In 2003, he enrolled in the Academy of Dramatic Art at the University of Zagreb, graduating in 2008.

In 2009, with director Nevio Marasović he co-wrote and starred in the pilot for the TV series The Instructor, which later became the first Croatian mockumentary TV series.

In 2011, he earned a Master of Fine Arts degree in film acting at the Central School of Speech and Drama in London.

On stage, he has starred in productions of the National Theatre in Zagreb, the National Theatre in Rijeka, the National Theatre in Varaždin, the Trešnja Theatre, the KULT Theatre and the Gavella Drama Theatre.

He provided the voice of President Arnold Schwarzenegger in the Croatian dub of The Simpsons Movie (2007).

Selected filmography

Stage

 They Shoot Horses, Don't They? as Robert Syverten, Croatian National Theatre (2008)
 Dundo Maroje as Maro Marojev, Croatian National Theatre (2008)
 Elton John's Sunglasses as Shaun, Croatian National Theatre (2008)
 Mourning Becomes Electra as Orin Mannon, Croatian National Theatre (2008)
 Sorrows of Young Werther as Werther, KULT (2007)
 No One's Son as Patient 002, Croatian National Theatre (2006)
 Cinderella as Storyteller, Tresnja (2006)

References

External links

1983 births
Living people
Male actors from Zagreb
Croatian male film actors
Croatian male stage actors
Croatian male television actors
Alumni of the Royal Central School of Speech and Drama
Academy of Dramatic Art, University of Zagreb alumni
21st-century Croatian male actors